Avengers Unplugged is a six-issue limited series published by Marvel Comics.

Publication history
Avengers Unplugged ran irregularly from October 1995 to August 1996. Mark Gruenwald was the editor for issues #5–6. John Statema did artwork for the series.

Plot summary
Issue #1 features Black Widow, Giant-Man, Hercules and the Vision battling Nefarius, as they transport him to The Vault, following the events in Captain America #443.

In issue #2, Graviton attacks the Avengers, but is defeated when they overload his powers, banishing him to yet another alternate dimension.

Issue #3 features Black Widow and Crystal on a "ladies night out", where they encounter the Super-Adaptoid, right before the events of Timeslide: The Crossing.

In issue #4, Titania asked the Absorbing Man to marry her.  The wedding was attended by many supervillains; while the Avengers interrupted the ceremony, they left the couple alone.

Monica Rambeau starred in issue #5. When Genis-Vell becomes an adventurer, he is known as Captain Marvel like his father before him—which Rambeau resents. After she, Starfox and Genis team up to defeat the Controller, Genis tries to concede the Captain Marvel title to Rambeau since he felt she was more worthy of it. Rambeau declines out of respect for the Mar-Vell legacy and adopts a new alias as Photon.

In issue #6, Sean Dolan was drawn to the second Ebony Blade, and once again became Bloodwraith.

References

Avengers (comics) titles
Marvel Comics titles